Isabel (IPA: [ʔɪsɐ'bɛl]), officially the Municipality of Isabel, is a 1st class municipality in the province of Leyte, Philippines. According to the 2020 census, it has a population of 46,781 people.

History 
The town was formally established and created by carving out the villages of Quiot, Santa Cruz, Libertad, Matlang, Tolingon, Bantigue, Apale and Honan from the town of Merida, by the passage of Republic Act No. 191.

Geography
Isabel is bounded to the east by the municipality of Merida and to the north by the municipality of Palompon.

Barangays
Isabel comprises 24 barangays.

Climate

Demographics

Economy

Leyte Industrial Development Estate (LIDE) is a 425 ha special economic zone in the industrial town of Isabel. It currently has 2 locators: PASAR(Philippine Associated Smelting & Refining Corporation) & PHILPHOS(Philippine Phosphate Fertilizer Corporation).

Education

References

External links

 [ Philippine Standard Geographic Code]
Local Governance Performance Management System 

Municipalities of Leyte (province)
Mining communities in the Philippines